The Onze-Lieve-Vrouw ten Troost Kerk (Church of Our Lady of Consolation), simply known as the Troostkerk, is a basilica in Vilvoorde, Belgium. The history of the church and its Carmelite monastery (the oldest in Western Europe) go back 800 years. It was consecrated as a basilica on May 7, 2006 by Cardinal Godfried Danneels.

Elevation to Basilica

Owing to its important role as a  pilgrimage destination, the Carmel has a particular significance to the city of Vilvoorde. The Troostkermis or annual fair and holiday of the city of Vilvoorde is still celebrated today, starting on the third Sunday after Easter. The church was elevated to the status of basilica, on 7 May 2006, and since that date pilgrims have begun visiting from other Belgian provinces.

Gallery

See also
 List of Catholic churches in Belgium

References
Luk Biesemans, Rijkdom van stilte en rust.

External links

Basilica churches in Belgium
Churches in Flemish Brabant
Vilvoorde